Brad Barr (born July 27, 1975) is an American guitarist and singer-songwriter, best known for his work with The Slip, The Barr Brothers and Surprise Me Mr. Davis.

In 2007, Barr collaborated with Jade McNelis on her album All the Fables  In 2008, Barr collaborated with Sonya Kitchell on her album This Storm. In 2009, he performed on the Land of Talk album, Fun and Laughter.

On September 16, 2008, Barr released an album of solo instrumental guitar music entitled The Fall Apartment on Tompkins Square Records.

In 2021, Barr collaborated with Morcheeba on "Say It's Over", a track on the band's tenth studio album Blackest Blue.

References

1975 births
Living people
American singer-songwriters
American male singer-songwriters
American rock songwriters
American rock singers
American experimental guitarists
American male guitarists
American rock guitarists
American indie rock musicians
The Slip (band) members
21st-century American guitarists
21st-century American male singers
21st-century American singers